Beaudouin is a French surname. Notable people with the surname include:

Patrick Beaudouin (born 1953), French politician
Michel Beaudouin-Lafon (born 1961), French computer scientist
Sophie Beaudouin-Hubière (born 1972), French politician

See also
Beaudouin's snake-eagle, a bird of prey in the family Accipitridae
Bourg-Beaudouin, a commune in the Eure department in Normandy in northern France

French-language surnames